Kudelski SA is a Swiss company that sells digital television access and management systems, cybersecurity solutions, Internet of Things products, and public infrastructure. The company is headquartered in Cheseaux-sur-Lausanne. Kudelski's first successful product was the Nagra tape recorder, developed by founder and Polish researcher Stefan Kudelski.

André Kudelski, the son of founder Stefan Kudelski, became the chief executive officer in 1991. The rest of the executive board includes chief financial officer Mauro Saladini, chief operating officer Morten Solbakken, and executive vice president Nancy Goldberg.

History 
Kudelski Group was founded in 1951 by Stefan Kudelski, while he was an engineering student at a Swiss university. The company's first product was the Nagra I, a reel-to-reel tap recorder, which weighed 11 pounds and measured 5"x7"x12" (roughly the size of a shoe box). It was succeeded by the Nagra II in 1953, which improved sound quality with additional mechanical filters.

Kudelski released the Nagra III tape recorder in 1958, which could synchronize sound with the frames on a reel of film, which became popular for on-location filming. It was used by directors including François Truffaut, Jean-Luc Godard, and D. A. Pennebaker. The Nagra SN, or Série Noir, was released in 1970, which was originally designed for use by the United States Secret Service. Kudelski later expanded into television services, providing its access control system for pay television to Canal+ in 1989.

André Kudelski replaced his father, Stefan Kudelski, as chief executive officer in 1991 following pressure from investors.

OpenTV, an internet and digital television company was fully acquired by the Kudelski Group on March 29, 2010.

Subsidiaries
 SKIDATA, headquartered in Austria, manufactures access control systems and software for their management. SKIDATA provides turnstiles, admission ticketing, electronic ticketing systems, boom barriers, and other pedestrian and vehicular access control devices to ski resorts, parking lots, amusement parks, shopping malls, airports, and municipalities, among others.
 Nagravision is a developer of conditional access systems for cable and satellite television, and a number of other companies involved in the audio, Internet security, digital television, public access and smart card industries.
 OpenTV is a software company for interactive and digital television. Its primary business is the sale of set-top-box operating systems and software as well as digital advertising products.
 Kudelski Security is an international cybersecurity company, with headquarters in Phoenix, Arizona.
 SmarDTV is designing Set-Top boxes and CAM Modules.

References

Companies based in the canton of Vaud
Television companies of Switzerland
Technology companies established in 1991
Technology companies of Switzerland
Swiss brands
Companies listed on the SIX Swiss Exchange
Swiss companies established in 1991